Aleksandr Vladislavovich Ushakhin (born 26 September 1964) is a Russian professional football coach and a former player.

Career
On 29 January 2019, Palanga announced that Ushakhin joined the club's staff together with Artyom Gorlov.

References

External links
 

1964 births
Living people
Soviet footballers
Russian footballers
Russian football managers
Russian expatriate football managers
Russian expatriate sportspeople in Lithuania
Expatriate football managers in Lithuania
FC Luch Vladivostok managers
FK Palanga non-playing staff
Association football defenders
FC Amur Blagoveshchensk players
People from Blagoveshchensk
Sportspeople from Amur Oblast